Ashby School, formerly known as Ashby Grammar School, is a co-educational day secondary school and sixth form in Ashby-de-la-Zouch, Leicestershire, England. The school is situated in the centre of Ashby on two sites.

History
Ashby Grammar School, the original boys' school, was founded in 1567 by Henry Hastings, 3rd Earl of Huntingdon. The girls' grammar school opened in 1901. They merged in 1972 and became comprehensive. Ashby School became an academy on 1 October 2012.

Previously an upper school, in September 2022 the school expanded its age range to 11, and became a full secondary school.

Headteachers
 T. A. Woodcock OBE 
 Charles Padel 
 John Brinsley the elder 
 Dr Ron Allison
 David Edward Herbert 
 Cedric Ingleton
 Vivian Keller Garnet 
 Eddie Green
 Geoff Staniforth

Former teachers
 Sir Mike Tomlinson CBE, Chief Inspector of Schools from 2000 to 2002 (head of chemistry from 1969 to 1977)

Infrastructure
Ashby School is based on two main sites (A, C and S blocks; and B block), based on adjacent roads. The school has spent considerable funds on the construction of a new science block, new rooms in the design department, and more recently, a new block built to accommodate music, art and media studies. However, from the 2020 academic year onwards, the former B block has been renovated into a new Sixth Form Campus where all KS5 (Year 12 and Year 13) lessons will take place; KS4 (Year 10 and Year 11) lessons now exclusively take place in the former A and C blocks.

Ashby School (School House) boarding accommodation

The school provided boarding accommodation for 75 boys from 10 -18 attending Ashby School, Ivanhoe College and Ashby Church of England School. It is located in a much extended Georgian House. Ofsted noted the homely nature of the house but was critical of many aspects that no longer meet modern standards. Fifteen years ago it was judged to be good. Ofsted acknowledges that the new senior leadership team accepts the judgment and is working to resolve the problem.

The boarding provision was removed a few years ago, and the buildings re-purposed into a sixth form area, as part of a change to make the school sites more secure.  Separating the KS4 and KS5 students.

School house system
Until 2022, the school had four houses: Bullen (yellow), Ferrers (blue), Hastings (green) and Loudoun (purple).

In 2021, a new house system was created by the sixth form senior team for sixth formers. These new houses are: Eagles (red), Falcons (blue), Hawks (green), and Kestrels (yellow). Since 2022, the senior team positions of head boy and head girl have been renamed to house captain.

Performance
In October 2019, Ofsted gave the school an "inadequate rating", though conceding that the teaching was good and the students were well behaved enthusiastic learners. Inadequate management procedures brought the overall grade down. Safeguarding of students was ranked as inadequate due to fire procedures being not tight enough and registers not being completed accurately, for example students being marked as educated off-site when they are actually on-site.

Gifted and talented
'Da Vinci' is the school's current gifted and talented system. The 'Tip Tops' is a group of primary pupils in years 5 and 6 from local primary schools in the Ashby area. They attend after-school sessions in which they are tutored in advanced mathematics, literacy, film studies, science, art, and philosophy by gifted and talented students from Ashby School. The Ashby School's gifted and talented programme was rated three stars by the National Association for Gifted Children in 2010. In November 2011 a Russian cosmonaut involved in the planning of the crewed mission to Mars visited the school and gave a lecture to the 'G&T'.

Medals controversy
In 2016 Ashby School created controversy when it proposed to auction the medals, including a Victoria Cross, won by Lt Col. Philip Bent that had been donated to the school "to inspire future pupils". The medals had been on long-term loan to the Royal Leicestershire Regimental Museum (part of Newarke Houses Museum), but had not been on display there for over forty years. The school planned to use the proceeds to fund the building of a sports pavilion. In 2018, the school received funding from the National Healthy Schools Programme for a new pavilion.

Notable former pupils

Former pupils are known as Old Ashbeians.
 Andrew Betts, basketball player
 Henry Dartnall, popular musician
 Dorian West (former England Hooker)
 The Young Knives
 Nathan Buck (Leicestershire County and England U19 Cricket Player)
 Tom Hopper (actor, best known for playing Sir Percival in Merlin (TV Series))
 Jane Plant, geochemist, scientist, and author

Ashby-de-la-Zouch Boys’ Grammar School
 Sir Geoffrey Arthur, Master of Pembroke College, Oxford, 1975–84 
 John Bainbridge (astronomer)
 Philip Bent, VC
 Sir John Bonser, barrister
 William Bradshaw, puritan
 Jack English, photographer
 Levi Fox, historian
 Anthony Gilby, clergyman
 Alexander Henry Green, geologist
 Leslie Hale, Baron Hale, Labour MP for Oldham from 1945 to 1950 and Oldham West from 1950 to 1968
 Joseph Hall, Bishop of Norwich
 Thomas Hemsley CBE, baritone
 Sir Joseph Hood, 1st Baronet, Conservative MP from 1918 to 1924 for Wimbledon
 Sir James Hunt, judge
 Reginald Jacques CBE, conductor
 David Nish, footballer, capped five times for England
 David Taylor, Labour MP from 1997 to 2009 for North West Leicestershire
 Bernard Vann, VC
 John Lane, architect, past president of the Royal Incorporation of Architects in Scotland and the Glasgow Institute of Architects

Ashby-de-la-Zouch Girls' Grammar School
 Averil Burgess OBE, Chairman from 1993 to 2000 of the Independent Schools Inspectorate, Headmistress from 1975 to 1993 of South Hampstead High School
 Nora David, Baroness David
 Clare Hollingworth, journalist
 Angela Piper, actress, plays Jennifer Aldridge (née Archer) in The Archers
 Prof Diane Reay, Professor of Education since 2005 at the University of Cambridge

References

External links
 Official site
 Leics CC page

Educational institutions established in the 1560s
1567 establishments in England
Secondary schools in Leicestershire
Ashby-de-la-Zouch
Academies in Leicestershire